The PL-11 is a medium-range semi-active radar homing (SARH) air-to-air missile (AAM) developed by a subsidiary of the Shanghai Academy of Spaceflight Technology in the People's Republic of China. It is a development or copy of the Italian Aspide AAM, which in turn was developed from the American AIM-7 Sparrow. The PRC may have started license production of the Aspide using imported parts but the license was cancelled following the 1989 Tiananmen Square protests and massacre. Development started in 1990, and the first live-fire test occurred in 2002 from a Shenyang J-8 IIB.

Description
The PL-11 was the People's Liberation Army Air Force's main medium-ranged AAM until the PL-12.

The HQ-61 is the surface-to-air missile (SAM) variant of the PL-11.

References

Citations

Bibliography

Guided missiles of the People's Republic of China
Air-to-air missiles of the People's Republic of China
Weapons of the People's Republic of China
Air-to-surface missiles of the Cold War